Caterham Cricket Club is an English cricket club at Caterham in Surrey. The club runs teams in the Surrey County League and plays at Old Cats playing fields in Caterham. The modern club dates from the 1870s.

Historically the club the 18th century and between 1767 and 1770 played matches against prominent teams such as the Hambledon Club and Bourne Cricket Club. At this time the club was effectively representative of Surrey as a county. Its home venue was on Caterham Common. The club patron was Henry Rowett, a prominent landowner in the area.

References

Former senior cricket clubs
English cricket teams in the 18th century
Sports clubs established in the 1760s
English club cricket teams
Cricket in Surrey
1767 establishments in England